The Hong Kong national Baseball5 team represents Hong Kong in international Baseball5 competitions.

History
Hong Kong participated in the inaugural Baseball5 Asia Cup in Kuala Lumpur, where they finished fourth after losing the bronze medal game 0 matches to 2 against South Korea.

Hong Kong did not qualify for the 2022 Baseball5 World Cup held in Mexico City, but were invited to participate by the WBSC to replace Australia. They were eliminated in the first round after finishing 0–5. During the placement round, the team won one games and lost two games for a final record of 1–7, finishing in the last place of the championship.

Current roster

Staff

Tournament record

Baseball5 World Cup

Baseball5 Asia Cup

References

National baseball5 teams in Asia
Baseball5